Omeo Kumar Das (21 May 1895 – 23 January 1975), popularly addressed as Lok Nayak, was an Indian social worker, Gandhian, educationist, writer and a former minister at the Government of Assam. He held various ministerial portfolios such as Education, Labour and Food and Civil Supplies, during various periods, in the state of Assam. He translated The Story of My Experiments with Truth, the autobiography of Mahatma Gandhi, into Assamese language and contributed to the implementation of Tea Plantation Worker’s Provident Fund in the state. The Government of India awarded him the third highest civilian honour of the Padma Bhushan, in 1963, for his contributions to society. India Post honoured Das by issuing a commemorative stamp on him on 15 May 1998.

Early life

Das was born on 5 May 1895 at Nagaon district in the Northeast Indian state of Assam and his schooling was at Tezpur High School, Tezpur. He did his higher education at Cotton College, Guwahati and City College, Calcutta during which time he was reported to have been attracted to the activities of Indian independence activists such as Gopal Krishna Gokhale and Bal Gangadhar Tilak and started getting involved in student politics.

Political life
He was one of the leaders of the Civil disobedience movement of 1930 in Assam and was jailed many times during the freedom struggle. He successfully contested the Assam legislative Assembly and the Constituent Assembly elections of 1937 and 1945 respectively and, after the Indian independence, he represented Dhekiajuli Assembly constituency for three consecutive terms, 1951, '57 and '62. During these periods, he served as the minister in various portfolios. It was during his tenure as the Labour minister, the Worker's Provident Fund for the labourers of the tea plantations was instituted, an initiative reported to be among first such instances in Asia. As the minister of Education, his contributions were noted in the implementation of basic education scheme in Assam. He also served as the minister of Food and Civil Supplies for a period of time.

Literary work
Das is credited with the publication of several books, including Mor Satya Aneshwanar Kahini, an Assamese language translation of The Story of My Experiments with Truth, the autobiography of Mahatma Gandhi. Gandhijir Jiboni, Mahatma Gandhik Aami Kidore Bujilu and Asomot Mahatma are some of his other works. He was involved with the activities of several social and Gandhian organisations such as Harijan Sevak Sangh, Bharatiya Adim Jati Sevak Sangha, Bharat Sevek Samaj, Gandhi Smarak Nidhi, Kasturba Smarak Nidhi and Assam Seva Samiti and was a part of their social activities like campaign against substance abuse and rehabilitation of patients afflicted with leprosy and tuberculosis.

Awards and honours
The Government of India included him in the 1993 Republic Day honours list for the civilian award of the Padma Bhushan. He died on 23 January 1975, aged 81, survived by his wife, Pushpalata Das, renowned freedom activist and parliamentarian, and their daughter. Omeo Kumar Das Institute of Social Change and Development (OKD), Guwahati, an autonomous institution funded by the Indian Council of Social Science Research (ICSSR), was named after Das, on his birth centenary in 1995. India Post issued a commemorative postage stamp on him in 1998. A college at Dhekiajuli has been named, Lokonayak Omeo Kumar Das College, in his honour.

See also 
 Chandraprava Saikiani
 Pushpalata Das
 Kushal Konwar
 List of people on the postage stamps of India

References

External links 
 
 

Recipients of the Padma Bhushan in social work
1895 births
1975 deaths
People from Nagaon district
Assamese people
Indian independence activists from Assam
Indian social reformers
Indian male writers
Gandhians
City College, Kolkata alumni
Cotton College, Guwahati alumni
20th-century Indian educational theorists
Scholars from Assam
20th-century Indian translators